Lee Rock is a 1991 Hong Kong crime film directed by Lawrence Ah Mon, and starring Andy Lau as the title character. The film chronicles the rise and fall of a corrupt police force that Lee Rock becomes a part of. The film was followed by a sequel Lee Rock II released later in the same year.

Cast and roles 
 Andy Lau as Lee Rock
 Sharla Cheung as Grace Pak
 Chingmy Yau as Ha / Rose
 Ng Man-tat as Piggy
 Paul Chun as Sergeant Ngan Tung
 Kwan Hoi-san as Sergeant Chan
 Michael Chan as King Crab
 William Ho as Triad Boss
 Lee Siu-kei as Drill Officer
 Eddy Ko as Police instructor
 Chun Wong as Big Brother Ma
 Jamie Luk as Little Brother Ma
 Lung Fong as Master Snake
 James Tien as Pak / Silverfish
 Wong Yat-fei as Ha's Father
 Louis Roth as Commissioner Alan
 Ridley Tsui as Rascal at nightclub 
 Cheung Tsan-sang as Mad Dog
 Jonathan Isgar as British Police Officer

Awards and nominations

References

External links 

 HK Cinemagic entry

1990s Cantonese-language films
Hong Kong crime drama films
1991 films
1991 crime drama films
Police detective films
Golden Harvest films
Films directed by Lawrence Ah Mon
Crime films based on actual events
Films set in the 1940s
Films set in the 1950s
Films set in the 1960s
Films set in Hong Kong
Films shot in Hong Kong
1990s Hong Kong films